Light Out of Darkness (A Tribute to Ray Charles) is a 1993 studio album by Shirley Horn, recorded in tribute to Ray Charles.

Reception

According to the AllMusic review by Scott Yanow: "Horn sounds nothing like Charles, but she sometimes captures his spirit...While emphasizing ballads, as one always expects, this is a fun set that includes more medium-tempo tunes than usual for a Shirley Horn set".

Track listing
 "Hit the Road Jack" (Percy Mayfield) – 3:11
 "Just a Little Lovin'" (Eddy Arnold, Zeke Clements) – 4:07
 "You Don't Know Me" (Arnold, Cindy Walker) – 2:58
 "Drown in My Own Tears" (Henry Glover) – 5:04
 "Hard Hearted Hannah" (Milton Ager, Charles Bates, Bob Bigelow, Jack Yellen) – 3:36
 "Georgia on My Mind" (Hoagy Carmichael, Stuart Gorrell) – 5:20
 "Makin' Whoopee" (Walter Donaldson, Gus Kahn) – 3:54
 "Bein' Green" (Joe Raposo) – 3:16
 "Bye Bye Love" (Felice and Boudleaux Bryant) – 5:26
 "The Sun Died" (Ray Charles, Hubert Giraud, Anne Gregory, Pierre Delanoë) – 5:39
 "How Long Has This Been Going On?" (George Gershwin, Ira Gershwin) – 4:01
 "If You Were Mine" (James Lewis) – 3:25
 "I Got a Man" (Charles, Renald Richard) – 3:25
 "Just for a Thrill" (Lil Armstrong, Don Raye) – 4:25
 "Light Out of Darkness" (Charles, Rick Ward) – 5:25

Personnel
Performance
Shirley Horn – piano, vocals, producer
Gary Bartz – alto saxophone
Charles Ables – guitar, electric bass
Tyler Mitchell – double bass
Steve Williams – drums
The Hornettes – vocal ("Hit the Road Jack")
Production
Dave Baker – engineer, mixing
Lynn Butterer – assistant producer, post production assistant, pre-production assistant
Suzanne Dyer – assistant engineer
Robert Friedrich – assistant engineer
Nate Herr – production coordination
Jimmy Katz – photography
Dan Kincaid – mastering
Michael Klotz – design
Sheila Mathis – production coordination
Richard Seidel – executive producer
Camille Tominaro – project coordinator

References

1993 albums
Shirley Horn albums
Ray Charles tribute albums
Verve Records albums